Offender is a 2012 British action film which follows a hard grafting, 20-year-old working-class man, Tommy Nix, who while avoiding getting mixed up in the wrong crowd sees his girlfriend fall victim to a brutal attack.  It stars Kimberley Nixon, Joe Cole, Shaun Dooley and Vas Blackwood. It is written by Paul Van Carter and directed by Ron Scalpello.

Cast
 Kimberley Nixon as Elise
 Shaun Dooley as Nash
 Joe Cole as Tommy
 English Frank as Jake
 Tyson Oba as Mason
 G FrSH as Angelface
 Daniel Kendrick as Sicko
 Scorcher as Essay
 Malachi Kirby as Harry
 David Ajala as Kelvin
 Ruth Gemmell as Cassie
 Mark Harris as Governor Davies
 Jacob Anderson as Patrick
 Vas Blackwood as Detective Boaz
 Doon Mackichan as the Doctor Patricia
 Can Somer as the Muslim Inmate
 Michael Edwards as Prison Officer
 Rimmel Daniel as Prison inmate
 Ric Ashley Smith as Pillion
 Mic Righteous as himself

Reception
The film received mixed reviews from critics, with a 68% score on review aggregator Rotten Tomatoes.
Empire magazine and Total Film both rated it 3/5, with Empire Magazine stating it was "a solid revenge thriller in which Cole excels"
The Guardian gave it one star, stating "the plot and characters are lame and implausible, the dialogue is banal and the acting mediocre". Time Out claimed the film "feels less Scum and more like the back-story of one of Guy Ritchie’s knuckle-headed footsoldiers."

The film received a 4/5 rating from Heat magazine stating "this bloody borstal drama makes quiet political points alongside a powerful revenge storyline" and a 4/5 rating from Sky Movies calling it an "admirably crafted a compelling drama" and likening it to French prison film A Prophet and Alan Clarke's 1979 film Scum.

CineVue presented a 3/5 review for the film, stating that "Scalpello's Offender is far from original" However it presented "enjoyable performances and an entertaining revenge plot."

In general the reviews rate the film for its depiction of characters involved in and affected by the riots. The Londonist states "It’s a surprisingly comprehensive look at the lives of young criminals, in particular their sense of isolation and disenchantment with a corrupt system."

The film gained more positive reviews from urban and music press. Music sites Bring The Noise and MTV have rated the film 8/10 and 7/10  respectively.

References

External links

2012 films
British prison drama films
British thriller films
British films about revenge
Hood films
2010s prison drama films
2010s English-language films
2010s British films